Akbar Hossain Pathan (born 18 August 1948), known by the stage name Farooque, is a Bangladeshi actor, politician, businessman, producer, member of parliament and a freedom fighter. He is known as 'Mia Bhai' (respected brother) to mass people. He appeared in over 150 films in a career spanning more than five decades. Most of his films were commercially and critically successful. Farooque is one of the most recognizable star of the classical and golden era of Bangladeshi film industry.

He is the first awardee of the Bangladesh National Film Award for Best Supporting Actor for the film Lathial in 1975 which he declined.  In addition, he was awarded the Bangladesh National Film Award for Lifetime Achievement in 2016. As one of the most dominant actors in the Bangladeshi movie scene during the 1970s, 1980s and early 1990s, Farooque is widely considered one of the greatest and influential actors in the history of Bangladeshi cinema. He is critically acclaimed as one of the finest actors of Bangladesh.

During Operation Searchlight, 25 March 1971, he participated in the first resistance of the liberation war in Malitola, Old Dhaka as second in command of their own guerrilla force commanded by 'Nader Gunda'. Later, Farooque succeeded as commander and continued the fighting.

He is a ruling Awami League member of Parliament(MP) for Dhaka-17 since 2018 Bangladeshi general election.

Early life
Farooque's hometown is in Kaliganj Upazila, Gazipur. Farooque was born and raised in Old Dhaka. His father was a medical doctor.

He was associated with the politics in Six point movement in 1966. 37 cases were filed against him by Pakistani military junta for participating in six point movement.

He was a freedom fighter at the 1971 Liberation War. In liberation war, he was closely associated with and fought alongside guerrilla legend 'Nader Gunda' as second in command. During Operation Searchlight, 25 March 1971, he participated in the very first resistance of the liberation war in Malitola as second in command of their own guerrilla force commanded by 'Nader Gunda'.  After killing of 'Nader Gunda' by Pakistani forces, Farooque succeeded as commander and continued the fighting.

Career
Farooque started his career in silver screen through the film Jolchobi in 1971. This brave veteran and multiple award-winning actor has contributed enormously to shape the Golden Era of the Bangladeshi film industry. Golapi Ekhon Traine, Lathial, Abar Tora Manush Ho, Mia Bhai, Sareng Bou, Padma Meghna Jamuna, Ekhono Onek Raat; the list of his milestone works continues to adorn his career. Though he shared screen with every leading actress of his time, most of Farooque's works were associated with the actresses Bobita, Rozina and Kabori.

Most of his films were in village settings, though he is recognized as a versatile actor. He established himself as the most popular protagonist in village setting films. Most of his films were massive hits.

He produced more than a dozen of films through his production company FP Films. Farooque was one of the founder of Film Artist Association and incumbent president of Bangobandhu Sangskritik Jot.

Farooque is also a businessman except his acting career. He is the managing director of Farooque Kniting and Dying Manufacturing Company situated in Kaliakoir, Gazipur.

As a political activist, Farooque is associated with Bangladesh Awami League politics since 1966. He was elected to Parliament from Dhaka-17 as a candidate of Bangladesh Awami League on 30 December 2018.

Personal life
Farooque is married to Farhana Farooque. They have a daughter, Fariha Tabassum Hossain, and a son, Rowshon Hossain.

In September 2020, Farooque was tested positive for tuberculosis (TB) and was admitted to Mount Elizabeth Hospital in Singapore. Earlier, on 16 August 2020, he was admitted to a private hospital due to fever. After, he was in intensive care unit (ICU) for 4 months. In January 2022, it was revealed that two flats of his, priced at 15 crore taka, was sold.

Filmography

Awards
 Bangladesh National Film Award for Best Supporting Actor (1975)
 Bachsas Awards
 Bangladesh National Film Award for Lifetime Achievement

References

External links
 
 Farooque at the Bangla Movie Database

1948 births
Living people
People from Gazipur District
National Film Award (Bangladesh) for Lifetime Achievement recipients
Bangladeshi male film actors
Bangladeshi male television actors
Male actors in Bengali cinema
11th Jatiya Sangsad members
Bangladeshi actor-politicians
Best Supporting Actor National Film Award (Bangladesh) winners